In mathematics, vector algebra may mean:
 Linear algebra, specifically the basic algebraic operations of vector addition and scalar multiplication; see vector space.
 The algebraic operations in vector calculus, namely the specific additional structure of vectors in 3-dimensional Euclidean space  of dot product and especially cross product. In this sense, vector algebra is contrasted with geometric algebra, which provides an alternative generalization to higher dimensions.
 An algebra over a field, a vector space equipped with a bilinear product
Original vector algebras of the nineteenth century like quaternions, tessarines, or coquaternions, each of which has its own product. The vector algebras biquaternions and hyperbolic quaternions enabled the revolution in physics called special relativity by providing mathematical models.

Algebra